Ectopoglossus atopoglossus is a species of frog in the family Dendrobatidae. It is endemic to Colombia and only known from its type locality in the Cordillera Occidental, on the border between the departments of Valle del Cauca and Chocó.

It is threatened by habitat loss from agriculture expansion, water pollution, fumigation of illegal crops and timber extraction. Searches in 1997 found no sign of this species so the current population status is unknown. Very little else is known about this species. It is known next to a stream in sub-Andean forest.

References

atopoglossus
Amphibians of Colombia
Amphibians described in 1997
Endemic fauna of Colombia
Taxonomy articles created by Polbot